Agapanthia villosoviridescens, also known as the golden-bloomed grey longhorn beetle, is a species of beetle in the subfamily Lamiinae, found in the Caucasus, Europe, Kazakhstan, the Near East, Russia and Turkey.

Description and habitat

The beetle is named for its golden-black colour, with a golden bloom on its elytron and thorax.

Habitat
Their flight time is from May to August. For the larval development the species is quite polyphagous with a wide variety of hosts, probably including Aconitum, Angelica, Anthriscus, Artemisia, Aster, Carduus, Cirsium, Chaerophyllum, Eupatorium, Foeniculum, Gentiana, Helleborus, Heracleum, Peucedanum, Salvia, Senecio, Urtica and Veratrum album. The larvae develop in the stalks of the host plant, working their way down while growing, cutting off the stalk and creating pupal cells near ground level. Adults emerge through a newly cut exit hole in the side of the stalk.

References

villosoviridescens
Beetles described in 1775
Beetles of Asia
Articles containing video clips
Taxa named by Charles De Geer